Kavar (also Romanized as Kavār; also known as Kaval) is a city and capital of Kavar County, Fars Province, Iran.  At the 2006 census, its population was 22,158, in 4,753 families.

See also

Ardashir-Khwarrah

References

http://sasanika.org/esasanika/qalatqobad-fort-a-sasanian-islamic-fort-in-kavar-southeast-of-shiraz/

Populated places in Kavar County

Cities in Fars Province